This article brings together lists of artists, locations, artistic productions and movements associated with upstate New York.

Literature

Writers
Diana Abu-Jaber, memoirist of her Central New York childhood who has set two of her novels there.
Chinua Achebe, the Nigerian writer, is a resident of Annandale-on-Hudson and has taught at Bard College since 1990.
Laurie Halse Anderson, a Potsdam native and resident of Onondaga County, writes for children and young adults. 
John Ashbery, poet laureate of New York state from 2001 to 2003. Born on a farm near Lake Ontario and raised in Rochester, was a resident of Hudson
Russell Banks, several of whose novels are set in Northern New York, who has served as New York State Author
L. Frank Baum, author of The Wonderful Wizard of Oz; resident of Chittenango
T. Coraghessan Boyle, who grew up in the Hudson Valley and who attended college in the North Country, which he describes as the "frozen skullcap of New York State"
Walter R. Brooks, author of the 26-book Freddy the Pig series set in central New York. Born in Rome, NY, Brooks lived in Rochester, New York City, and lastly in Roxbury, NY. 
Ned Buntline, a pseudonym of Edward Zane Carroll Judson, the publisher, journalist, writer and publicist best known for his dime novels and the Colt Buntline Special he commissioned from Colt's Manufacturing Company.  Edward Judson was born and died in Stamford.
John Burroughs of Roxbury, a naturalist and essayist important in the evolution of the U.S. conservation movement. According to biographers at the American Memory project at the Library of Congress, John Burroughs was the most important practitioner after Thoreau of that especially American literary genre, the nature essay. 
Frederick Busch, who taught at Colgate University and whose characters are often Downstate New Yorkers transplanted upstate
Hayden Carruth, poet, who taught at Syracuse University and lived in Munnsville
Raymond Carver, who taught at Syracuse University
Brock Clarke, who grew up in Little Falls, and who has set novels there and in Watertown.
Lucille Clifton, poet, born in Depew. Though African-American, she grew up speaking Polish as well as English in the neighborhood.
James Fenimore Cooper, who wrote The Last of the Mohicans in Warrensburg, and who spent the last years of his life in Cooperstown
Robert White Creeley, professor of poetry at the State University of New York at Buffalo, and New York State Poet from 1989 to 1991
Leslie Daniels, who wrote the novel Cleaning Nabokov's House
William D. Danko, of Albany, author of The Millionaire Next Door
Lydia Davis, a contemporary American author and translator of French, who teaches at SUNY Albany.
Walter D. Edmonds, born in Boonville, author of "Drums Along the Mohawk" and the Erie Canal novel "Rome Haul."
Frederick Exley, from the Watertown area
Harold Frederic, from Utica, set his novels in 19th-Century Upstate New York.
Tess Gallagher, who taught at Syracuse University
John Gardner, Batavia native and SUNY Binghamton professor
Tim Green, who grew up in Liverpool and who was a student at Syracuse University of Raymond Carver and Tobias Wolff
Washington Irving, resident of Tarrytown, who is buried in Sleepy Hollow
Mary Jemison, the "White Woman of the Genesee," whose story was told in J. E. Seaver's classic captivity narrative "Narrative of the Life of Mrs. Mary Jemison" (1824; latest ed. 1967)
William J. Kennedy, the Bard of Albany
Maurice Kenny, Mohawk poet from Saranac Lake
James Howard Kunstler, resident of Saratoga Springs
Alison Lurie, resident of Ithaca
Bill McKibben, longtime resident of the Keene Valley in the Adirondacks
Herman Melville, resident of Albany and graduate of the Lansingburgh Academy, who began writing his first novels in Lansingburgh
Lorrie Moore, whose novel "Who Will Run The Frog Hospital?" is set in the Lake George  area 
Howard Frank Mosher, usually associated with the Northeast Kingdom of Vermont, but who grew up in Cato and who has written about the North Country 
William Henry Harrison Murray, known as "Adirondack Murray"
Vladimir Nabokov, resident of Ithaca
Solomon Northup of Saratoga Springs, who published an account of his abduction and ordeal entitled "Twelve Years a Slave" in 1853. The book was written with the help of David Wilson, a local writer.  Published when the novel Uncle Tom's Cabin was a bestseller, Northup's book sold 30,000 copies within three years.
Joyce Carol Oates, born in Lockport
Camille Anna Paglia, born in Endicott
David Pietrusza, born in Amsterdam
Daniel Pinkwater, resident of the Hudson Valley
Connie Porter, grew up in Lackawanna
Richard Russo, from Johnstown and Gloversville, many of whose novels are set in the Mohawk Valley
Edna St. Vincent Millay, resident of Austerlitz
George Saunders, who teaches at Syracuse University
Delmore Schwartz, poet, Syracuse University professor and mentor to Lou Reed
W. D. Snodgrass of Erieville 
Sparrow, poet, resident of Phoenicia
Julia Spencer-Fleming, native of Plattsburgh and resident of Argyle and Liverpool, whose books are set in the Adirondacks
Dana Spiotta of Syracuse and Cherry Valley, whose novel Eat the Document is set in part in Little Falls.
Wendy Corsi Staub, born and raised in Dunkirk and Fredonia, New York Times bestselling author
Sandra Steingraber, an American biologist and author in the tradition of Rachel Carson, who lives in Trumansburg.
Trevanian, born in Granville
Mark Twain, resident of Elmira and Buffalo
Kurt Vonnegut, who began his literary career in Schenectady while working for General Electric in the early 1950s, and who set some of his novels in "Ilium," a fictionalized Schenectady
John A. Williams of Syracuse, novelist of the black experience in white America. 
Edmund Wilson, summer resident of Talcottville and author of "Upstate: Records and Recollections of Northern New York."  New York: Farrar, Straus & Giroux, 1971; reprint, Syracuse: Syracuse University Press, 1990 and "Apologies to the Iroquois." New York: Farrar, Straus & Cudahy, 1960; reprint, paper, Syracuse: Syracuse University Press, 1992
Tobias Wolff, who taught at Syracuse University

Venues
Millay Colony for the Arts, residency program for writers, composers and visual artists 
Yaddo, an artists' community in Saratoga Springs.

Music

Musicians
Harold Arlen, native of Buffalo, composer of popular song including "Over the Rainbow"
Melissa Auf der Maur, Montrealer and former bassiste of Hole and The Smashing Pumpkins, now lives in "a small town in Upstate New York"
Carla Bley, resident of Willow, near Woodstock.
Joe Bonamassa, born in Utica
Fran Cosmo of the band Boston, resident of Upstate New York
Elizabeth Cotten, resident of Syracuse
The late Chuck Cuminale, Rochester's Bodhisattva, aka Colorblind James of The Colorblind James Experience 
Blossom Dearie, jazz singer and pianist, who grew up in East Durham
Ani DiFranco of Buffalo
Ronnie James Dio, raised in Cortland
Donna The Buffalo of Trumansburg
Ray Evans, songwriter and native of Salamanca
Renée Fleming, soprano, who grew up in Rochester, studied at the Crane School of Music at the State University of New York at Potsdam, the University of Rochester's Eastman School of Music and Juilliard.
Jackson C. Frank, folksinger, who grew up in Cheektowaga and later lived in Woodstock
Greg Graffin, vocalist of Bad Religion who is a resident of Upstate New York
Lou Gramm, of Foreigner, from Rochester
Son House, resident of Rochester
Rick James, born in Buffalo
Gary Lewis of Gary Lewis & The Playboys, although a Californian, now makes his home in Henrietta
Riki Lindhome of Portville, member of Garfunkel and Oates
John Lombardo of Buffalo, former founding member of 10,000 Maniacs and member of folk duo John & Mary
the song "Low Bridge, Everybody Down", also known as "Fifteen Years on the Erie Canal" or "Fifteen Miles on the Erie Canal", by Thomas S. Allen
Lydia Lunch, born in Rochester
Teo Macero, producer of the Miles Davis album, Kind of Blue, from Glens Falls
Chuck Mangione of Rochester
Gap Mangione of Rochester
Natalie Merchant of Jamestown
Mitch Miller, born in Rochester, a graduate of the Eastman School of Music
Chauncey Olcott, songwriter of "My Wild Irish Rose" and "When Irish Eyes are Smiling"
Steve Perry, lead singer of the Cherry Poppin' Daddies, born in Syracuse and raised in Apalachin
Kristen Pfaff of Buffalo, first bassist of Hole
Mary Ramsey of Buffalo, lead singer of 10,000 Maniacs and member of folk duo John & Mary
Sigurd Raschèr of Shushan, one of the most important figures in the development of the 20th century repertoire for the concert saxophone. 
Pete Seeger, protest singer and environmental activist. Longtime resident of Fishkill, he co-founded the Hudson River Sloop Clearwater organization
Colleen Sexton, from Syracuse
Martin Sexton, from Syracuse
Billy Sheehan, from Buffalo, bass guitarist and co-founder of the band Talas
Joanne Shenandoah of the Oneida Nation
Kim Simmonds of the British blues band Savoy Brown, now a resident of Oswego
Alice Tully, opera singer and philanthropist, born in Corning
Jimmy Van Heusen, songwriter, native of Syracuse, 1944 winner of an Academy Award for Best Original Song for "Swinging on a Star"
Jerry Jeff Walker, born in Oneonta
Alec Wilder, native of Rochester, composer
Gary Wilson, native of Endicott, experimental musician
Thomasina Winslow, born New Baltimore, resident of the Albany area
Tom Winslow of New Baltimore

Bands and groups
10,000 Maniacs of Jamestown
Blotto, a new wave band from Albany
Brand New Sin, a hard rock band from Syracuse
The Burns Sisters of Ithaca
Cannibal Corpse, a death metal band originally from Buffalo
Every Time I Die from Buffalo
Gym Class Heroes from Geneva
Goo Goo Dolls, from Buffalo
Honor Bright, pop-punk band from Syracuse
The Horse Flies of Trumansburg
Joywave from Rochester
Manowar from Auburn
The Modernaires, from Buffalo
moe. from Buffalo
Old Crow Medicine Show, originally formed around Trumansburg and Ithaca
Ra Ra Riot, an indie rock band from Syracuse
Soulive from Woodstock
Spyro Gyra of Buffalo
State Champs, a pop punk band from Albany
X Ambassadors from Ithaca

Festivals
Finger Lakes GrassRoots Festival of Music and Dance
The Great Blue Heron Music Festival of Sherman
Summer Jam at Watkins Glen, 1973
Woodstock Music Festival
Yasgur Road Reunion, Yearly Woodstock Reunion festival at Yasgur's Farm in Bethel, NY

Venues
Caffe Lena of Saratoga Springs, the oldest continuously operating coffee house in North America, founded by Lena Spencer

Fine arts

Artists
Milton Avery, born in Altmar, buried in Woodstock
George Bellows – painter
Jake Berthot
Ralph Albert Blakelock
Arnold Blanch – painter 
Lucile Blanch - painter
Francis Bicknell Carpenter (1830–1900), an American painter born in Homer.  Carpenter is best known for his painting First Reading of the Emancipation Proclamation of President Lincoln, which is hanging in the United States Capitol.
Wendell Castle (*1932), Rochester, furniture artist 
Frederic Church
Thomas Cole (1801–1848), painter regarded as the founder of the Hudson River School
Arthur Bowen Davies, born in Utica, a principal organizer of the 1913 Armory Show and a member of The Eight, a group of painters including five associated with the Ashcan School
Dorothy Dehner
Arthur Dove, born in Canandaigua
Wilhelmina Weber Furlong (1878-1962) of Glens Falls, the first female modernist painter in the American Modernism movement.
Sanford Robinson Gifford
Phillip Guston
Ellsworth Kelly
Rockwell Kent
Ronnie Landfield
Mark Miremont of The Niagara Frontier, artist and philosopher
Robert Mangold
Sylvia Plimack Mangold
Brice Marden
Fletcher Martin
Arto Monaco of Upper Jay, artist, theme park designer, toy designer, and cartoonist.
Samuel Morse (1791–1872), a painter perhaps best known for his portraits, lived on his estate, Locust Grove in the Town of Poughkeepsie
Grandma Moses
Georgia O'Keeffe, resident of Lake George
Marla Olmstead, Binghamton
Albert Paley (*1944), Rochester, modernist metal sculptor
Larry Poons
Frederic Remington (1861–1909), painter, illustrator, sculptor, and writer
Manuel Rivera-Ortiz (*1968), Rochester, photographer
Randall Schmit – painter
David Smith, Bolton Landing
Frank Stella
Alfred Stieglitz (1864–1946), resident of Lake George, photographer
William James Stillman (1828–1901), painter, journalist, and photographer
Seneca Ray Stoddard (1844–1917), photographer
Israel Tsvaygenbaum, Russian-American artist
Bradley Walker Tomlin

Venues
Byrdcliffe Colony 
The Roycroft workshop
Storm King Art Center
 Art Omi, Ghent, New York

Collections
Dia:Beacon
Columbia County Historical Society, Columbia County, New York

Cartoonists
Scott Adams, the creator of the Dilbert comic strip, was born in Windham, New York and is an alumnus of Hartwick College.
Brad Anderson of Marmaduke, lives in Chautauqua County
Vaughn Bode of Cheech Wizard, born in Utica, New York
Nicholas Gurewitch, the creator of the Perry Bible Fellowship web comic, was born in Canandaigua, New York, and is an alumnus of Syracuse University.  He now resides in Rochester, New York.
Johnny Hart (of B.C. and The Wizard of Id), from Endicott
Margaret Shulock of Six Chix, resides in Franklinville
Tom Toles, The Washington Post editorial cartoonist, from Buffalo
Garry Trudeau of Doonesbury, raised in Saranac Lake

Photographers
Charles Bierstadt
George Eastman
Milton Rogovin
Carleton Watkins

Architecture

Architects and builders
Louise Blanchard Bethune (1856–1913), born in Waterloo was the first American woman known to have worked as a professional architect.
Claude Bragdon, whose main architectural practice was in Rochester
Daniel Burnham, Chicago architect born in Henderson
William L. Coulter, Adirondack architect
Andrew Jackson Downing
William West Durant
Harvey Ellis
Irving Gill, San Diego architect born in Tully
Philip Hooker
Benjamin A. Muncil, Adirondack master builder
James Renwick, Jr., born in Bloomingdale in Essex County
Marcus T. Reynolds of Albany
Charles Mulford Robinson of Rochester, a chief promoter of the City Beautiful movement in America, and a pioneering urban planning theorist. 
Joseph Lyman Silsbee, Syracuse architect who upon relocating to Chicago gave Frank Lloyd Wright his first drafting job
Ward Wellington Ward

Styles
Adirondack Architecture, the Great Camp style
Cobblestone masonry
The Hudson River School
The Hudson River Bracketed style 
Octagon houses, a mid-nineteenth-century fad promoted by Cohocton native Orson Squire Fowler in his book The Octagon House: A Home for All. An estimated half of all octagon houses were constructed in Central and Western New York. Extant examples can be seen in Akron, Brasher Falls, Syracuse, Camillus, Hammondsport, Newport and Canandaigua.

Buildings
Olana, residence of Frederic Church
Luykas Van Alen House, 1737 Dutch Architecture

Design

Designers
Elbert Hubbard, founder of the Roycroft Community
Warren McArthur, furniture designer
Adelaide Alsop Robineau, potter and editor of the ceramics publication Keramic Studio
Gustav Stickley, Arts and Crafts furniture designer, architect and editor of The Craftsman magazine
Leopold and John George Stickley, furniture designers and manufacturers

Workshops
Steuben Glass Works

Products
the Adirondack Chair
the Adirondack guideboat
the American Arts and Crafts (American Craftsman) Movement
Shaker Furniture

Folk Traditions
Minstrel shows, which persisted in New York State into the mid-twentieth century

Showbiz

Entertainers
George Abbott, born in Forestville, theater producer and director, playwright, screenwriter, and film director and producer whose career spanned more than seven decades
Lucille Ball, from Jamestown
Tom Cruise, born in Syracuse
William Devane, born in Albany
Kirk Douglas, from Amsterdam, graduate of St. Lawrence University
Susie Essman, a resident of Glenmont, is a comedian and comic actress in television and films. She is best known for her role as Susie Greene, the verbally abusive wife of Larry David's manager on the HBO show Curb Your Enthusiasm.
Annette Funicello, born in Utica
Vincent Gallo, born in Buffalo
Richard Gere, graduate of North Syracuse High School
George 'Gabby' Hayes, born in Wellsville
Philip Seymour Hoffman, born in Rochester, New York
Mary-Margaret Humes, born in Watertown
Grace Jones, graduate of Central High School in Syracuse, who studied theater at Syracuse University
Tom Kenny, actor and comedian, born in Syracuse and graduated from Bishop Grimes Junior/Senior High School. He is best known as the voice of SpongeBob SquarePants.
John McGiver of Fulton, Schoharie County, New York
Michael O'Donoghue, from Sauquoit
Sam Patch, known as "The Yankee Leaper," the first famous US daredevil.
David Hyde Pierce, born in Saratoga Springs
Bill Pullman, born in Hornell
Rachael Ray of Lake Luzerne
Mark Ruffalo, a resident of Sullivan County
Savanna Samson, a Watertown native
John Sayles, from Schenectady
Rod Serling, from Interlaken
The Shubert Brothers, from Syracuse
Arthur C. Sidman, born in Homer, a vaudeville performer and playwright.
Maureen Stapleton, born in Troy
Fran Striker of Buffalo, a writer for radio and comics who was best known for creating The Lone Ranger and The Green Hornet.

Traditions
 Comedians of the Borscht Belt

Films set or made in upstate New York
Brother's Keeper, a 1992 documentary about an alleged 1990 murder in the village of Munnsville, New York.
Bruce Almighty (2003). Bruce Nolan (Jim Carrey) is a television news reporter for Channel 7 Eyewitness News on WKBW-TV in Buffalo, New York.
Buffalo '66 (1998)
Camp (2003), about an upstate New York performing arts summer camp. The film was filmed at the Stagedoor Manor summer camp in Loch Sheldrake. 
Canadian Bacon (1995). John Candy plays a local sheriff named Bud B. Boomer. The movie was filmed in Toronto, Hamilton, and Niagara Falls, Ontario; and Buffalo and Niagara Falls, New York.
Down to the Bone (2005).  The main character is a checker at Price Chopper.
The Farmer Takes a Wife, a 1935 comedy film.  Dan Harrow (Henry Fonda) works along the Erie Canal during the mid-19th century to raise money to buy a farm. A musical remake appeared in 1953.  The films were based on a 1934 play by Frank B. Elser and Marc Connelly, based in turn on the novel Rome Haul by Walter D. Edmonds.
Frozen River (2008) set in and around Massena and the Mohawk Nation of Akwesasne, but filmed in Plattsburgh and elsewhere in Clinton County.
Gasland (2010), a documentary that negatively portrays the efforts of natural gas drilling in the Marcellus Formation
Haldane of the Secret Service (1924), directed by and starring Harry Houdini, co-starring Gladys Leslie as Adele Ormsby, with William J. Humphrey as Edward Ormsby, filmed at Beaver Kill Falls in the Village of Valatie.
The Horse Whisperer (1998) with Robert Redford. Some scenes were shot in Saratoga Springs. The crew also attempted to use the bridge located on Tabor road in Mechanicville for the snowy bridge scene in this movie, but ended up using one in California instead. 
Ironweed (1987), set in Albany
Lady in White (1988) a horror film of the ghost/mystery genre. Much of the film was made in Wayne County. The movie is based on the story of The Lady in White who supposedly searches for her daughter in Durand-Eastman Park in Rochester, New York while protecting young women who are on dates with their boyfriends.  The film was directed, produced, and written by Frank LaLoggia, a native of Rochester. 
The Natural (1984), starring Robert Redford, Robert Duvall, Glenn Close. Many of the baseball scenes were filmed in Buffalo, New York's War Memorial Stadium, built in 1937 and demolished a few years after the film was produced. Buffalo's All-High Stadium stood in for Chicago's Wrigley Field in a key scene.
Martha Marcy May Marlene (2011) Elizabeth Olsen, John Hawkes. Many stock, mountain, and lake scenes were filmed upstate in the Catskill mountains.
Nobody's Fool (1994) filmed in Beacon, Fishkill, Poughkeepsie,and Hudson.
Planes, Trains and Automobiles (1987) portions filmed in Gowanda.
The Sterile Cuckoo (1969).  Much of the movie was filmed at Hamilton College in Clinton. Some of it was filmed in Sylvan Beach, New York.
Super Troopers (2001) portions filmed in Beacon, Fishkill and Newburgh.
Synecdoche, New York (2008) was filmed and set in part in Schenectady.
Taking Woodstock (2009), a comedy-drama film about the Woodstock Festival of 1969 directed by Ang Lee and filmed in New Lebanon.
Woodstock, the documentary of the 1969 music festival in Bethel, in which Arlo Guthrie marvels to the crowd, "The New York State Thruway is closed, man!"
York State Folks (1915) from the original play by Arthur C. Sidman.
You Can Count on Me (2000), takes place in the fictionalized Catskill communities of Scottsville and Auburn, New York. The film was primarily shot in and around Margaretville, New York.

Major museums
Adirondack Museum, Blue Mountain Lake
Albright-Knox Art Gallery, Buffalo
Albany Institute of History and Art, Albany
Antique Boat Museum, Clayton
Corning Museum of Glass, Corning
Chapman Historical Museum, Glens Falls
Columbia County Historical Society, Museum & Library, Town of Kinderhook
George Eastman House, Rochester
Erie Canal Museum, Syracuse
Everson Museum, Syracuse
Farmers' Museum, Cooperstown
Genesee Country Village and Museum, Mumford
International Boxing Hall of Fame, Canastota
Harness Racing Museum & Hall of Fame, Goshen
Herbert F. Johnson Museum of Art, Ithaca
Hyde Collection, Glens Falls
Memorial Art Gallery, Rochester
Munson-Williams-Proctor Arts Institute, Utica
Museum at Bethel Woods, Bethel, exhibiting the history and culture of the 1969 Woodstock Festival
National Baseball Hall of Fame and Museum, Cooperstown
National Museum of Racing and Hall of Fame, Saratoga Springs
National Museum of Dance, Saratoga Springs
National Soaring Museum, Elmira
National Soccer Hall of Fame, Oneonta
National Women's Hall of Fame, Seneca Falls
New York State Military Museum, Saratoga Springs
New York State Museum, Albany
New York State Museum of Cheese, Rome
Northeast Classic Car Museum, Norwich
Frederic Remington Art Museum, Ogdensburg
Salt Museum, Liverpool
Strong - National Museum of Play, Rochester

See also
List of museums in New York
List of people from Woodstock, New York

References

Further reading
"The Ten Best Upstate New York Movies", Film Critic

New York (state)-related lists
Upstate New York